Monplaisir is a French surname. Notable people with the surname include:

Hippolyte Monplaisir (1821–1877), French choreographer, dancer, and ballet master
Sharon Monplaisir (born 1960), American fencer 

French-language surnames